Northpole is a 2014 American-Canadian Christmas fantasy television film directed by Douglas Barr. It premiered on the Hallmark Channel on November 15, 2014, and stars Tiffani Thiessen, Josh Hopkins, Bailee Madison and Max Charles. The film was followed by a sequel, Northpole 2: Open for Christmas, released in November 2015. Bailee Madison returned to play Clementine the Elf while the lead pair was played by Lori Loughlin and Dermot Mulroney.

Main Cast
 Bailee Madison as Clementine the Elf
 Stefanie Buxton as Clementine's mother
 Robert Wagner and Donovan Scott as Santa Claus
 Jill St. John as Mrs. Claus
 Tiffani Thiessen as Chelsea
 Josh Hopkins as Ryan
 Lori Loughlin as Mackenzie Warren
 Dermot Mulroney as Ian Hanover

Films

Reception
Brian Lowry of Variety wrote, "Sweet and inoffensive, one needn't be a complete Grinch to wish the festive doings contained a little more spice and less saccharine." Mary McNamara of the Los Angeles Times wrote, "Northpole may be a cookie-cutter take on Christmas, but it's one with high-quality ingredients." Matt Roush of TV Guide wrote, "It's all very traditional, conventional, satisfying for those who like their schmaltz as concentrated as a double espresso".

See also 
 List of Christmas films
 Santa Claus in film

References

External links

Northpole at Hallmark Channel

2014 television films
2014 films
American fantasy films

American Christmas films
Canadian fantasy films
Canadian television films
Canadian Christmas films
English-language Canadian films
Films shot in Montreal
Hallmark Channel original films
Christmas television films
Films directed by Douglas Barr
2010s American films
2010s Canadian films
Santa Claus in film